Route 636 is a  long mostly north–south secondary highway in the southwestern portion of New Brunswick, Canada. Most of the route is in Prince William Parish.

The route starts at Route 635 in Lake George where it travels south past Lake George. From there, it travels through a sparsely populated area past Lake Harvey before ending in Harvey Station at Route 3.

History

See also

List of highways numbered 636

References

636
636